Presently, in Africa, Google Street View can be seen in parts of Botswana, Uganda, South Africa, Kenya, Eswatini, Lesotho, Senegal, Ghana, Tunisia, Nigeria, Rwanda, the Canary Islands of Spain, and Egypt's landmarks.

Background 
On September 1, 2009, Google announced that it started collecting images in South Africa for Google Maps Street View. Google is currently driving around South Africa in Toyota Priuses, taking photographs of locations in the cities of Johannesburg, Pretoria, Cape Town, Port Elizabeth, Durban and East London. Google Trikes are also being used for the first time to map popular tourist destinations, such as the scenic Chapman's Peak Drive and Table Mountain in Cape Town, Soccer City in Johannesburg, and the new Moses Mabhida Stadium in Durban.
Images of South Africa were made available on Google Street View on June 8, 2010.

On December 8, 2010, more locations in South Africa were added. These were mostly rural and main roads, as well as a much larger coverage of the Limpopo province. After the update, the borders of South Africa's neighboring countries could be reached.

On November 27, 2012, Botswana was added.

On March 18, 2013, Tanzania was added.

On April 23, 2013, Lesotho was added.

On September 20, 2013, Eswatini was added.

On April 21, 2014, more locations in Lesotho and Botswana were added.

On September 9, 2014, landmarks in Egypt were added.

On February 18, 2014, more locations in South Africa were added.

On May 6, 2015, Madagascar was added.

On September 15, 2015, landmarks in Kenya were added.

On October 8, 2015, Uganda was added.

On February 8, 2017, Ghana, Senegal and landmarks in Uganda were added.

On March 18, 2017, Tunisia was added.

On July 27, 2017, Nigeria was added.

On July 25, 2018, landmarks in Nigeria were added.

On October 4, 2018, Kenya was added.

On July 24, 2019, more locations in Nigeria were added.

In October 2022, more locations in Kenya were added. More locations were also added in Senegal and Nigeria. Later in the same month, the first official footage was added for Rwanda was added, this can be only be found in the capital Kigali for now. All four of these countries used a generation four camera to take the footage with.

Introductions by year

Areas included 
Click on the Google Street View icon   to view a specific location such as a tourist site or landmark.

Reference:



Landmarks in Egypt including Pyramids of Giza, Cairo Citadel, Saqqara, Monastery of Saint Mina, Citadel of Qaitbay and more.

Most cities and roads.

Most roads in Réunion.

Main roads and several cities throughout the country
Landmarks: The National Theater , Kumasi Zoo , Cape Coast Castle , Elmina Castle , Fort Batenstein , Fort Metal Cross , Fort Dorothea Akwidaa , Fort Saint Anthony , Fort San Sebastian , Labadi Beach , Accra Arts Centre , Kwame Nkrumah Mausoleum , W. E. B. Du Bois Memorial Centre for Pan African Culture , Aburi Botanical Gardens , Ankasa Conservation Area

Samburu National Reserve, Lewa Wildlife Conservancy, parts of Marania Farm near Mount Kenya

Western half of the country: Maseru and major roads.

Landmarks: Avenue of the Baobabs, Rova of Antananarivo

Water views of Barren Isles, Nosy Komba, Sambirano River, Ambalahonko, Velondriake, Avenue of the Baobabs, and the Sacred Forest.

There is a limited street view on just a few roads in the towns of Ambanja, Belo sur Mer and Morondava.

Abuja, Benin City, Enugu, Gwagwalada, Ibadan, Lagos and surroundings and roads between
 Landmarks: Nigerian National Museum , Lekki Conservation Centre , Spot Where Royal Niger Company Flag was lowered , Olumo Rock , Tinubu Square , Freedom Park , National Children's Park And Zoo Abuja , The Traffic Bar & Restaurant , Jabi Boat Club , African Artists' Foundation , Terra Kulture , Rele Art Gallery , Yemisi Shyllon Museum of Art

In Madeira (which geographically belongs to Africa according to geographical definitions: closest mainland), 
most towns, cities, villages, major and rural roads are covered.

In the Azores (which have a location with little more unclear connection to a continent), the islands of São Miguel Island and Terceira Island have good coverage.

In October 2022, Google released official coverage in the capital Kigali, and this adds a new country to Street View. Google used a generation four camera to capture this footage with.

Landmarks: Apartheid Museum, Johannesburg Zoo

Main roads and several cities throughout the country
Landmarks: Historical Museum of Senegal in Gorée , House of Slaves , Mariama Bâ School , St. Charles Eglise , Mémorial Gorée-Almadies , Mausole Seydou Nourou Tall , African Renaissance Monument , Institut Français du Sénégal , Lake Retba , Great Mosque of Medina Baye Kaolack , Hann Forest and Zoological Park

The Canary Islands do geographically belong to Africa according to geographical definitions (closest mainland).

Most towns, cities, villages, major and rural roads in the Canary Islands are covered.
Ceuta and Melilla have some coverage.

Uhuru Peak and some nearby spots and Gombe national park

The coastal main road and selected streets in cities along it, including Tunis and Sfax
 Landmarks: Bardo National Museum , Carthage National Museum , Sousse Archaeological Museum , Utica National Museum , Sbeitla Archaeological Museum , Museum of Popular Arts and Traditions of Le Kef , National Monument of the Kasbah , Ennejma Ezzahra , Basilica of Damous El Karita , Carthage amphitheatre , Salammbo Tophet , Roman Theatre of Carthage , Mausoleum of Sidi Bou Said , Hammouda Pacha Mosque , Al-Zaytuna Mosque , Great Mosque of Kairouan , Great Mosque of Sousse , Great Mosque of Mahdiya , Sidi Jemour Mosque , Borj El Ghazi Mustapha , Eglise Dar El Kous , St. Peter's Basilica , Skifa el Kahla , Sidi Abid el Ghariani Mausoleum , Ribat of Sousse , Ribat of Monastir , Mausoleum of Sidi Mezri , Amphitheatre of El Jem , Oudhna Amphitheater , Kasbah of Sfax , Kasbah of Le Kef , Basins of Aghlabides , Zaouia of Sidi Sahabi , Kobba Bent el Rey , Fort Génois De Tabarka , Borj El Loutani , Fort Gharl El Melh , Roman Mausoleum of Maktar , Thermes de Maktaris , Ong Jmal , Dougga , Althiburos Ruins , Thuburbo Majus , Bulla Regia Archaeological Site , Utica Archaeological Site , Ichkel National Park , Ksar Ouled Soltane , Ksar Beni Barka , Ksar of Medenine , Tamaghza Golden Canyon

Uganda got views of most roads inside and around Entebbe and Kampala.



Some walk paths around Sandy Bay are covered by Street View.

There are dense sequences of photo spheres along main roads, similar to full Street View coverage.

Unofficial coverage

Zimbabwe. Views of some highways and the central business districts of Harare, Chegutu, Rusape, Masvingo and two United Nations World Heritage Sites: Great Zimbabwe National Monument and Victoria Falls. The first instances of Google Street View in Zimbabwe were contributed by photographer Tawanda Kanhema.

Future Coverage

Notes

References 

Geography of Africa
Communications in Africa
Africa